Luisa Regimenti (born 5 June 1958 in Rome) is an Italian Coroner and politician, Member of the European Parliament since 2019.

References

1958 births
Living people
MEPs for Italy 2019–2024
21st-century women MEPs for Italy
Lega Nord MEPs